XHESH-FM/XESH-AM is a radio station on 97.7 FM in Sabinas Hidalgo, Nuevo León, Mexico. The station is owned by Grupo Radio Alegría and is known as Radio Sabinas.

History
XESH-AM received its concession on October 30, 1967. It was owned by Tomás García Jiménez and broadcast on 1400 kHz with 250 watts. It was sold to the current concessionaire in 1977 and soon after raised its power to 1,000 watts.

In January 2012, XESH was authorized to migrate to FM.

References

1967 establishments in Mexico
Radio stations established in 1967
Radio stations in Nuevo León
Radio stations in Mexico with continuity obligations
Regional Mexican radio stations
Spanish-language radio stations